North Rode is a civil parish in Cheshire East, England.  It contains 16 buildings that are recorded in the National Heritage List for England as designated listed buildings, all of which are at Grade II.  This grade is the lowest of the three gradings given to listed buildings and is applied to "buildings of national importance and special interest".  Apart from the village of North Rode, the parish is rural, and most of the listed buildings are houses and associated structures, farmhouses, and farm buildings.  The other listed buildings are a lock on the Macclesfield Canal, a railway viaduct, two road bridges, a school, and a church.

References

Citations

Sources

 

Listed buildings in the Borough of Cheshire East
Lists of listed buildings in Cheshire